The 1907 Punjab unrests were a period of unrest in the British Indian province of Punjab, principally around the Colonisation bill that was implemented in the province in 1906. This timeline has often been called the beginning of the freedom movement in Punjab. Important leaders of this movement include Ajit Singh, Het Thakkar, among others.

Colonisation Bill 
The Colonisation Bill was passed in 1906. The Punjab Land Alienation Act, 1900 had already caused a feeling of discontent among the elite urban classes, and the Colonisation Bill provided for transfer of property of a person after his death to the government if he had no heirs. The Government could sell the property to any public or private developer. This was completely against the social conditions prevailing in the region and hence it was rejected by all the sides.

Agitation 
The agitation against these measures of the Government was led by Ajit Singh, Uncle of Shaheed Bhagat Singh, he called for "extreme measures". The first of the protests was organised in the Chenab Colony, which was supposed to be the most affected by this bill. The first protest saw various organisations submitting memoranda to the government to redress their grievances, but the government failed to pay any heed to these documents. This agitation was followed by a protest at Lyallpur. These agitations led to the formation of secret societies like Anjuman-i- Muhibhan-i- Watan, the founder of which was Ajit Singh, a Jat Sikh who was believed to have the backing of Lajpat Rai.This period also saw protest by the working class in railways of Rawalpindi. This period saw mass agitations which finally ended in the deportation of Ajit Singh.

British Indian Army Mutiny 
In 1907, two years after the 1905 Partition of Bengal, British Indian Army soldiers in the 6th Jat Light Infantry and 10th Jats mutinied and sided with Bengali revolutionaries to takeover the government treasury. Their revolt was suppressed by the colonial government and several mutineers were sentenced to prison.

References

Bibliography
The Indian Army and the Making of Punjab By Rajit K Mazumder. p. 203. Published by Orient Longman, 2003. 
The Punjab Disturbances of 1907: The Response of the British Government in India to Agrarian Unrest. N. Gerald Barrier. Modern Asian Studies, Vol. 1, No. 4 (1967), pp. 353–383
The Garrison State: The Military, Government and Society in Colonial Punjab. by Tai Yong Tan. p. 95. Published by SAGE, 2005. .
The History of British India: A Chronology.by John F. Riddick. p. 92 Published by Greenwood Publishing Group, 2006. .

History of Punjab
History of agriculture in India
1907 in British India
Indian independence movement
Punjab Unrest, 1907
1907 in the British Empire
Conflicts in 1907